Lychnophora is a genus of South American flowering plants in the daisy family.

 Species

References

Asteraceae genera
Vernonieae
Flora of South America